La clemenza di Tito (1791) is an opera by Wolfgang Amadeus Mozart to a libretto by Metastasio.

Other settings of this libretto include:
 La clemenza di Tito (Caldara) 1734 – the original setting of the libretto
 La clemenza di Tito (Gluck), opera by Christoph Willibald Gluck (premiered 1752)
 La clemenza di Tito (Mysliveček), opera by Josef Mysliveček (premiered 1774)
 Composition exercises on "Serbate, o Dei custodi" by Franz Schubert, D 35 (1812), text taken from act 1, scene 5 
For a more complete list, see . (in German)